Henslowia is a genus of flowering plants belonging to the family Santalaceae.

Its native range is southern central China and Indo-China. It is found in the regions of Assam (India), China, Laos, Myanmar, Nicobar Is., Thailand and Vietnam.

The genus name of Henslowia is in honour of John Stevens Henslow (1796–1861). Henslow was a British priest, botanist and geologist. It was first described and published in Mus. Bot. Vol.1 on page 243 in 1851.

Known species, according to Kew:
Henslowia collettii 
Henslowia erythrocarpa 
Henslowia sessilis

References

Santalaceae
Santalales genera
Plants described in 1851
Flora of Indo-China
Flora of Assam (region)